The Ene River is a Peruvian river on the eastern slopes of the South American Andes.

Geography

Headwaters 

The river flows in a northwesterly direction at a total length of 180.6 km.

The Ene River is part of the headwaters of the Amazon River whose origin is at the Mismi south of Cuzco where it first becomes Apurímac River, then the Ene River and Tambo River before its waters meet the Ucayali River which later forms the Amazon.

At  the Ene River joins the Perené River at the town Puerto Prado, 295 m above sea level, and is called the Tambo from then on.

Threats
The proposed 2,200-megawatt Pakitzapango hydroelectric dam would flood much of the Ene River valley. Protests by the Central Ashaninka del Rio Ene (CARE, Asháninka Center of the Ene River) and Ruth Buendia (president since 2005) have halted the construction. For her efforts Buendia was awarded the Goldman Environmental Prize in 2014.

References

External links

Ene
Tributaries of the Ucayali River
Rivers of Cusco Region
Rivers of Junín Region
Rivers of Ayacucho Region